The Homorod or Ciucaș is a left tributary of the river Olt in Romania. It discharges into the Olt in Feldioara. Near the village of Satu Nou the river divides into two branches, the main branch keeping the name of Homorod, while the secondary branch is named Homorodul Vechi. The two branches join again upstream of Feldioara.

Tributaries

The following rivers are tributaries to the river Homorod (from source to mouth):

Left: Popilnica, Hămăradia, Valea Caselor, Valea Ursului, Geamăna (near Satu Nou)
Right: Valea Boului, Valea Cărbunelui, Geamăna (near Dumbrăvița), Pârâul Auriu, Vulcănița

References

Rivers of Romania
Rivers of Brașov County